The Tyrrell 012 is a Formula One racing car that was designed by Maurice Philippe for the Tyrrell team.

Overview

1983 
It was the first chassis built by the team to be composed mostly of carbon fibre, following on from Lotus and McLaren. The car was powered by the short-stroke version of the Ford Cosworth DFV that had previously been supplied to Lotus, after that team signed to use Renault turbo engines. The Benetton clothing company sponsored the team in 1983, with the large budget used to successfully develop the car. Although the car was light and nimble, it was no match for the massively powerful turbo cars.

Ken Tyrrell continued to use young, promising drivers in his team and helped develop their careers. Michele Alboreto, in his second year for the team, scored a point in the car's first race at Zandvoort.

Boomerang car 
The initial version of Tyrrell 012 had a triangle-shaped rear-wing design (and was nicknamed "boomerang"). The car with this wing design was seen only once during a grand prix weekend, in the hands of Michele Alboreto during practice for the 1983 Austrian Grand Prix. The same car design also appeared during F1 tyre testing at Brands Hatch in 1983.

1984 
For 1984, the sponsor was Systime Computers Ltd, a Leeds-based company that manufactured minicomputers.  Alboreto moved on to Ferrari and was replaced by Martin Brundle, whilst Stefan Bellof filled the other seat. The 012 was further developed with smaller sidepods and a larger rear wing to increase downforce. A newer version of the DFV, dubbed the DFY was provided to the team by Ford. Tyrrell were now the only one of the established teams to use the venerable engine. Both Brundle and Bellof impressed in their rookie seasons in F1, achieving solid placings and a podium place each, but after Brundle's second place in the Detroit Grand Prix the cars were disqualified by the FIA for various rule infringements and the team were excluded from the championship.

1985 
The 012 was pressed into service in the early races of 1985 and Bellof pulled off a run of points finishes until the 014 Renault turbo was introduced; its chassis almost identical to its predecessor's. The DFY engine, by the start of the 1985 season was around 300 hp down on most of the turbo-charged engines used by other teams that year. The 012 does, however, have the distinction of being the last Formula 1 car to enter a race powered by the DFV's development, the Cosworth DFY engine, with Martin Brundle driving in the 1985 Austrian Grand Prix. Brundle failed to qualify for the race.

By 1985 the 012 was the only car in Formula One still using a non-turbo engine which put the team at a severe power disadvantage. This was shown on the 1.8 km long Mistral Straight at Paul Ricard for the French Grand Prix. Brundle had been given use of the 012's replacement, the 014 which used a turbocharged Renault engine. He qualified 20th some 4.4 seconds faster than Bellof in the Cosworth powered 012 (Bellof was predictably 26th and last). Brundle said after qualifying that at one point while both were on a quick lap, he had followed Bellof's 012 onto the Mistral about 100 yards back, and by the time he reached Signes, Bellof was nothing more than a dot in his mirrors.

In 1985, two examples of this car were also used in Formula 3000 by Barron Racing Team.

Complete Formula One results
(key)

* 11 points scored using Tyrrell 011 in ** Tyrrell Racing disqualified for entire  season

References

External links

Tyrrell Formula One cars
1983 Formula One season cars
1984 Formula One season cars
1985 Formula One season cars
Formula One controversies